Gansurhinus is an extinct genus of moradisaurine captorhinid known from the Middle Permian Qingtoushan Formation of the Qilian Mountains and the Late Permian Naobaogou Formation in the Daqing Mountains of China. It was first named by Robert R. Reisz, Jun Liu, Jin-Ling Li and Johannes Müller in 2011 and the type species is Gansurhinus qingtoushanensis.

References

Captorhinids
Permian reptiles of Asia
Permian China
Prehistoric animals of China
Fossil taxa described in 2011
Prehistoric reptile genera